Peter John DeLuise (born November 6, 1966) is an American actor, television director, television producer, and screenwriter. He is known for his role as Officer Doug Penhall in the Fox TV series 21 Jump Street, and for directing and writing episodes of science fiction television shows, particularly in the Stargate franchise. He is the son of actors Dom DeLuise and Carol Arthur.

Career
DeLuise made his film debut in the 1979 film Hot Stuff. He landed his best known acting role, as Officer Doug Penhall, in the 1987 Fox series 21 Jump Street, alongside other promising actors including Johnny Depp. His brother Michael came on the show in the fifth season where he played his younger brother, Officer Joey Penhall. DeLuise is also well known for his role as Dagwood on the NBC science fiction television series SeaQuest DSV from 1994 to 1996.

DeLuise has made guest appearances on the television shows The Facts of Life, 21 Jump Street spin-off Booker, Friends, Supernatural, Highlander: The Series, Gene Roddenberry's Andromeda, and Stargate SG-1.

In 1997, he began working on the series Stargate SG-1, serving as producer, writer, director, and creative consultant.  He has appeared, normally as an extra, in every episode of the series he has directed. He went on to work as executive producer, director and writer for the Stargate SG-1 spin-off Stargate Atlantis, and directed eight episodes of the spin-off Stargate Universe. His father, Dom DeLuise, made a guest appearance in the Stargate SG-1 episode "Urgo", which Peter directed. Peter also made a cameo in the episode as the "Urgo" character transformed to be a young man in a United States Air Force uniform.

DeLuise directed the CBC television series jPod, based on the novel of the same name by Douglas Coupland, which debuted in January 2008 and directed the fantasy film Beyond Sherwood Forest.

He made a brief cameo appearance alongside Johnny Depp in the 2012 film adaptation, 21 Jump Street. Depp, DeLuise and Holly Robinson reprised their roles as Tom Hanson, Doug Penhall and Judy Hoffs, respectively.

Personal life
DeLuise was previously married to Gina Nemo; they divorced in 1992. He later married actress Anne Marie Loder on June 7, 2002; together they have one child.

Selected filmography

Film
 Hot Stuff (1979)
 Free Ride (1986)
 Solarbabies (1986)
 Winners Take All (1987)
 Listen to Me (1989)
 Children of the Night (1991)
 Rescue Me aka Street Hunter (1993)
 The Silence of the Hams aka Il Silenzio dei Prosciutti (1994)
 National Lampoon's Attack of the 5 Ft. 2 In. Women (1994)
 The Shot (1996)
 Between the Sheets (1998)
 Southern Heart (1998)
 Bloodsuckers (2005)
 The Bar (2007)
 Smile of April (2008)
 21 Jump Street (cameo) (2012)

Television
 Happy (1983)
 The Facts of Life, (1 episode, 1985)
 The Midnight Hour (1985)
 Diff'rent Strokes (1 episode, 1986)
 Booker (2 episodes, 1989)
 21 Jump Street (84 episodes, 1987–1990)
 Haunted Lives: True Ghost Stories (1 episode, 1992)
 Highlander: The Series (1 episode, 1992)
 The Hat Squad (1 episode, 1993)
 Street Justice (1 episode, 1993)
 Friends (as Carl, 1 episode, 1996)
 SeaQuest DSV (35 episodes, 1994–1996)
 3rd Rock from the Sun (1 episode, 1998)
 The New Outer Limits (1 episode, 1998)
 V.I.P. (1 episode, 2000)
 Before I Say Goodbye (2003)
 Stargate SG-1 (Loki; Season 7 Episode 3, 2003)
 Gene Roddenberry's Andromeda (1 episode, 2004)
 Bloodsuckers (Uncredited, 2005)
 Stargate Atlantis (Uncredited, Season 2 Episode 2, 2005)
 Engaged to Kill (2006)
 Stargate SG-1 (15 episodes, 5 uncredited episodes, 1999–2006)
 To Love and Die (Unknown episodes, 2007)
 Robson Arms (5 episodes, 2007)
 Painkiller Jane (1 episode, 2007)
 Sanctuary (2 episodes, 2007)
 Supernatural (1 episode, 2008)
 Yeti: Curse of the Snow Demon (2008)
 Stargate Universe (Peter; Season 1 Episode 4, 2009)
 Prep and Landing (2009; voice of Dancer)
 Sanctuary (1 episode, 2011)
 All Summer Long (TV Movie 2019) (Roland) (with wife)

Director
 21 Jump Street (3 episodes, 1990–1991)
 Silk Stalkings (2 episodes, 1996)
 Southern Heart (1999)
 The Net (2 episodes, 1998–1999)
 Hope Island (1 episode, 1999)
 Higher Ground (4 episodes, 2000)
 Romantic Comedy 101 (2001)
 V.I.P. (3 episodes, 2000–2001)
 The New Outer Limits (1 episode, 2001)
 Jeremiah (2 episodes, 2002)
 Just Deal (1 episode, 2002)
 Gene Roddenberry's Andromeda (8 episodes, 2003–2005)
 Stargate Atlantis (6 episodes, 2004–2006)
 Stargate SG-1 (57 episodes, 1999–2007)
 Blood Ties (1 episode, 2007)
 Painkiller Jane (2 episodes, 2007)
 jPod (2 episodes, 2008)
 Kyle XY (4 episodes, 2008–2009)
 Sanctuary (4 episodes, 2008–2011)
 Stargate Universe (8 episodes, 2009–2011)
 16 Wishes (TV film, 2010)
 Tower Prep (2 episodes, 2010)
 R. L. Stine's The Haunting Hour: The Series (13 episodes, 2011–2012)
 Level Up (11 episodes, 2012–2013)
 Zapped (TV film, 2014)
 R.L. Stine's Monsterville: Cabinet of Souls (TV film, 2015)
 Harvest Moon (TV film, 2015)
 Dark Matter (1 episode, 2016)
 Shadowhunters (2 episodes, 2017–2018) 
 When Calls the Heart (14 episodes, 2016–2021)
 Love Under the Olive Tree (TV film, 2020)

Producer
 Jeremiah (7 episodes, 2002)
 From Stargate to Atlantis: Sci Fi Lowdown (2004)
 Stargate Atlantis (19 episodes, 2004–2005)
 Stargate SG-1 (22 episodes, 2002–2003)
 Level Up (18 episodes, 2012–2013)
 All Summer Long (TV Movie 2019) (Executive Producer)

Writer
 Between the Sheets (1998)
 Stargate Atlantis (2 episodes, 2004)
 Stargate SG-1 (15 episodes, 2000–2005)
 When Calls the Heart (1 episode, 2022)

References

External links
 

1966 births
20th-century American male actors
21st-century American male actors
American male film actors
American male screenwriters
American male television actors
American male television writers
American writers of Italian descent
American television directors
American television writers
DeLuise family
Living people
Male actors from New York City
Writers from Manhattan
Screenwriters from New York (state)
Television producers from New York City
American expatriates in Canada